Sirippulogam is a 2012-2012 Indian Tamil language soap opera that aired on Sun TV from 18 June 2012 to 13 July 2012. The show starring by Chinni Jayanth, Vennira Aadai Moorthy, Chitti Babu, Aarthi, Ganeshkar and Badava Gopi. The show ended with 20 episodes

Plot
The serial was a humorous take on Yemalogam as Chinni Jayanth as Yema. The rift and problems between the ministers in the court of Yema is solved by Yema, in very comical way. The serial made the audience laugh out their everyday problems in their lives.

Cast
 Chinni Jayanth as Yema
 Vennira Aadai Moorthy as Chitraguptan
 Chitti Babu
 Aarthi
 Ganeshkar
 Badava Gopi

See also
 List of programs broadcast by Sun TV
 List of TV shows aired on Sun TV (India)

References

External links
 Official Website 
 Sun TV on YouTube
 Sun TV Network 
 Sun Group 

Sun TV original programming
2012 Tamil-language television series debuts
Television shows set in Tamil Nadu
Tamil-language stand-up comedy television series
Tamil-language talk shows
Tamil-language television miniseries
Tamil-language comedy television series
2012 Tamil-language television series endings